White Rock Plantation is a historic plantation house located near Hollister, Halifax County, North Carolina. It dates to the late-18th century, and is a two-story, five bay, transitional Georgian / Federal-style frame dwelling.  It has a gable roof and pairs of exterior chimneys at each end.  The front facade features a tall "Mount Vernon" porch added in the mid-20th century.

White Rock was the home of the Williams family and as many as 75 workers who they enslaved.

It was listed on the National Register of Historic Places in 1979.

References

Plantation houses in North Carolina
Houses on the National Register of Historic Places in North Carolina
Georgian architecture in North Carolina
Federal architecture in North Carolina
Houses in Halifax County, North Carolina
National Register of Historic Places in Halifax County, North Carolina